Dismorpha is a genus of beetles in the family Buprestidae, containing the following species:

 Dismorpha aequatoriana Cobos, 1990
 Dismorpha diffusa (Chevrolat, 1838)
 Dismorpha fossulata (Chevrolat, 1835)
 Dismorpha grandis Cobos, 1990
 Dismorpha irrorata (Gory & Laporte, 1839)
 Dismorpha juvenca (Gory, 1841)
 Dismorpha linearis (Linnaeus, 1758)
 Dismorpha marmorea (Kerremans, 1897)
 Dismorpha morosa (Chevrolat, 1835)
 Dismorpha plana (Fabricius, 1798)
 Dismorpha tenuis (Kirsch, 1873)

References

Buprestidae genera